"Lantern" is the tenth and final episode of the third season of the American television drama series Better Call Saul, the spinoff series of Breaking Bad. Written by Gennifer Hutchison and directed by series co-creator Peter Gould, "Lantern" aired on AMC in the United States on June 19, 2017. Outside of the United States, the episode premiered on streaming service Netflix in several countries.

In the episode, Jimmy plans to help Irene recover the trust of her friends at Sandpiper Crossing at the cost of his reputation, while Chuck is forced by Howard to resign from HHM, eventually causing a relapse of his condition. Meanwhile, Kim recovers at home from her wounds from the car crash, and Hector collapses from a stroke caused by Nacho.

The episode was seen by an estimated 1.85 million household viewers upon release, the most watched episode of the third season. This episode marks the final regular appearance of Michael McKean (Chuck McGill).

Plot

Opening 
In a flashback, a young Chuck McGill reads The Adventures of Mabel to a younger Jimmy McGill in a tent outside their family's Cicero, Illinois house. The camera zooms in on a lantern.

Main story 
Following her car crash, Kim Wexler's broken arm has been put in a cast. She returns with Jimmy to the site of the crash and Jimmy picks up her scattered papers. The following morning, Jimmy feels responsible for her accident because she took on a second client partially to help pay for their shared office space. Jimmy and Kim vacate their office to save money by having Kim work from home.

Hector Salamanca pays Nacho Varga's father, Manuel Varga, for use of Manuel's upholstery shop as a front for Hector's drug business. Manuel reluctantly takes the money to avoid retaliation from Hector. Nacho plans to ambush Hector but is pulled into a meeting between Hector, Gus Fring, and Juan Bolsa. Juan says Gus' organization will permanently handle cross-border smuggling for both Gus' operation and Hector's. An enraged Hector suffers a stroke. As Mike Ehrmantraut advised, Nacho takes the fake nitroglycerin capsules that Hector dropped and replaces them with the real ones. Gus looks at Nacho suspiciously but says nothing.

Jimmy expects Irene Landry's friends to forgive her after she accepted the Sandpiper settlement. However, he finds they still do not trust her, because now they think she will do anything to get on their good side. He stages an argument with Erin Brill and "accidentally" admits to tricking Irene, vindicating her to her friends and causing her to withdraw her acceptance.

Chuck promises to abandon his lawsuit if he can stay at HHM. Instead, Howard presents Chuck a check for $3 million—the first installment of Chuck's buyout. Howard criticizes Chuck for prioritizing his vendetta against Jimmy but praises Chuck profusely as he informs HHM's employees of Chuck's immediate retirement. Jimmy tries to make amends with Chuck but Chuck says Jimmy was never all that important to him. After Jimmy leaves, Chuck's EHS symptoms return and he destroys the walls of his house while trying to find the device that is making his electricity meter run. Unable to find the source, he destroys the meter in frustration. Five days later, Chuck lies on a couch and kicks a table several times, deliberately knocking over a gas lantern and starting a fire.

Production 

The episode was directed by series co-creator Peter Gould, who previously co-wrote "Mabel" earlier in the season, and written by Gennifer Hutchison, who previously wrote the episode "Sunk Costs".

Casting 
This episode marks the final regular appearance of Chuck McGill. In the final scene, when Chuck appears to commit suicide by kicking the lantern off his table and burning his house down, speculation arose over whether or not the act was actually fatal; the National Suicide Prevention Lifeline's toll-free number also appears onscreen. However, McKean confirmed that Chuck is indeed dead, stating:

Reception

Ratings 
Upon airing, the episode was watched by 1.85 million American viewers, and an 18-49 rating of 0.6.

Critical reception 
The episode received a great deal of critical acclaim. On Rotten Tomatoes, it attained a 92% rating with an average score of 8.79/10 based on 13 reviews. Terri Schwartz of IGN rated the episode 9.5/10 stars, saying "Better Call Saul pulled off a fantastic Season 3 finale that perfectly balanced its storylines and brought a big lesson to Jimmy's doorstep. With some hugely impactful moments that were both incredibly emotional and long-awaited by fans, "Lantern" proves that Better Call Saul is better than it's ever been with Season 3." Alan Sepinwall of Uproxx praised the final scene, remarking "the focus was primarily on sending off Chuck, and the finale did it right, in painstakingly painful fashion."

Notes

References

External links 
"Lantern" at AMC

Better Call Saul (season 3) episodes
Television episodes about depression
Television episodes about suicide